Mohamed Khamis Taher (born 30 December 1959) is a Libyan long-distance runner. He competed in the men's marathon at the 1992 Summer Olympics.

References

1959 births
Living people
Athletes (track and field) at the 1992 Summer Olympics
Libyan male long-distance runners
Libyan male marathon runners
Olympic athletes of Libya
Place of birth missing (living people)